Mary Gordon-Watson  (born 3 April 1948) is a British equestrian. She was born in Blandford. She won a team gold medal in eventing at the 1972 Summer Olympics in Munich, and finished fourth in individual eventing. She became European champion in 1969 in individual eventing, and in 1971 she was European champion in team eventing. In 1970 she became World champion in both individual and team eventing.

References

1948 births
Living people
People from Blandford Forum
Sportspeople from Dorset
Olympic equestrians of Great Britain
British female equestrians
Equestrians at the 1972 Summer Olympics
English Olympic medallists
Members of the Order of the British Empire
Olympic gold medallists for Great Britain
British event riders
Olympic medalists in equestrian
Medalists at the 1972 Summer Olympics